Oncideres digna is a species of beetle in the family Cerambycidae. It was described by Henry Walter Bates in 1865. It is known from Brazil, French Guiana, and Panama.

References

digna
Beetles described in 1865